Shuttleton is an Australian ghost town located in the Parish of Hume, County of Mouramba, New South Wales. The former village site is 29 km (18 miles) west-south-west of Nymagee.

It was founded in expectation of population growth following the discovery of gold in the district and nearby copper deposits. An outcrop of copper ore was discovered by prospector, John 'Jacky' Owen, an Aboriginal man, in late 1900; he had previously discovered gold at Gilgunnia. Owen was either employed by or working in partnership with Thomas Shuttle, who was living in the area as the caretaker of the Government Tank, at Crowl or Sandy Creek—both names were used because "crowl" was the local Aboriginal word meaning "sandy"—a watering place on a travelling stock route. Shuttle is credited as being the co-discoverer and it is he who took out the first mining lease in the area, known as "Shuttle's". However, it was on another lease—held by Eason, Mooney, and Osmetti—further north of the other leases, that the richest discovery was made, in February 1901, creating the need for a permanent settlement.

The new village of Shuttleton was proclaimed on 15 July 1902. The original settlement had been called (informally) Crowl Creek; it was subsequently named Shuttleton, after Thomas Shuttle, who was still exploring his lease in search of copper, around the time that site for the village was selected in 1901.  There was a family by the name of Shuttle in the village, for many years afterwards. Thomas Shuttle died, still living in the area, in 1928. It seems that Jacky Owen did not prosper from his discovery but he also lived to an old age.

By mid-1903, mining was in full swing and reverberatory smelters were under construction. The village had 330 to 350 inhabitants, a post office, police station, public school, two hotels, stores and other businesses. A wave of personal bankruptcies in the village suggests that its initial prosperity was short lived. In 1913, a day of horse racing took place there. The village had a market garden operated by ethnic-Chinese.

The mines at Shuttleton included the Crowl Creek Copper Mine, the Commonwealth Copper Mine, and the South Shuttleton Mine (later known as the Shuttleton Mine). The Crowl Creek Copper Mine had a smelter.  In August 1908, the Crowl Creek and Shuttleton Mines were purchased by Nymagee Copper Limited Co., operator of the copper mine at Nymagee; thereafter, the siicaceous ore from Shuttleton was blended with the 'basic' ore mined at Nymagee to facilitate its smelting. It is likely that, when the Nymagee operation closed in 1917, substantive mining operations at Shuttleton also ended. The mines and smelters at both Shuttleton and Nymagee had cost disadvantages, due to their reliance on road transport. There was not, and would never be, a railway to either settlement.

In late 1918, just before the end of the First World War, the village received the news that its former school teacher had been killed in action in France. The school closed in 1920. The post office closed in late 1928.

Once the copper mines closed, most inhabitants moved away. The size of the village's area was reduced in 1942 to suit its reduced circumstances. By 1945, it was no longer a polling place. By 1949, its buildings were mainly gone, but it was still significant enough to be, once again, a polling place in 1950. In 2006, one of Shuttleton's old churches was being used as a hay storage shed. Today there is virtually nothing left to show of the former village except its street grid, its cemetery, some mine ruins, and an access road—linking Priory Tank Road (from Nymagee) and Kidman Way—called Shuttleton Road.

References

External links

 Map of the village of Shuttleton (1910)

Cobar Shire
Mining towns in New South Wales
Ghost towns in New South Wales